Romophone was a UK historical reissues record label dedicated to restoring and transferring historic 78 rpm recordings of opera singers to CD. It was founded in 1993 by Louise Barder and Virginia Barder.

Romophone CDs characteristically present the complete recording output of a singer on a particular label in a particular period, in chronological order. Romophone has been praised for the accuracy and faithfulness of the material it presents, both discographic and musical. The CD liner notes include biographical material about the singers and photographs (often rare and previously unpublished). Libretti and lyrics are not included in the liner notes.

Singers represented on the Romophone label include Frances Alda, Lucrezia Bori, Edmond Clement, Léon David, Emma Calvé, Emmy Destinn, Emma Eames, Kirsten Flagstad, Amelita Galli-Curci, Mary Garden, Beniamino Gigli, Lotte Lehmann, Giovanni Martinelli, Edith Mason, John McCormack, Nellie Melba, Claudia Muzio, Pol Plançon, Rosa Ponselle, Elisabeth Rethberg, Tito Schipa, Elisabeth Schumann, Ernestine Schumann-Heink, Luisa Tetrazzini, Marcella Sembrich, Mattia Battistini, Mario Ancona and Leonard Warren among others. Two complete opera recordings from La Scala - Il Trovatore (1930) and Madama Butterfly (1929/30) - are in the catalogue, as well as collections including Wagner en Français, America the Beautiful, The Century's Greatest Singers in Puccini and Christmas From a Golden Age.

Romophone won a Gramophone Award for Best Historical Recording in 1996, for a volume of recordings by Lucrezia Bori, remastered by Ward Marston.

Romophone issued its first release in 1993, and ceased activity around 2003. The Romophone catalogue was acquired by Naxos.

See also
 List of record labels

References

External links
 Romophone CDs at naxoslicensing.com
 Searchable archive of Romophone CD reviews on the Gramophone website

British record labels
Record labels established in 1993
Record labels disestablished in 2004
Reissue record labels